Robert Arthur Fowler (18 September 1882 – 8 October 1957) was a Newfoundland-born long-distance runner who was recognized by the International Association of Athletics Federations as having set a world's best in the marathon on January 1, 1909 with a time of 2:52:45.4 at the Empire City Marathon in Yonkers, New York.

Biography
Fowler competed for the United States in the marathon at the 1904 Summer Olympics in St. Louis, Missouri as well as the 1906 Intercalated Games in Athens, Greece. He did not finish either race. Including the 1906 Games, Fowler was a three-time member of the United States Olympic Marathon Team.

Fowler finished third in the 1905 Boston Marathon behind Fred Lorz and Louis Marks. Two years later in Boston, he finished second to Thomas Longboat in a race in which he was blocked by a freight train in Framingham, Massachusetts for approximately two minutes. Fowler was in a second pack of runners that was separated from Longboat's lead pack when the train crossed the tracks. He competed in a total of nine Boston Marathons between 1903 and 1912, missing the 1906 running because it conflicted with the Olympic Games.

Fowler was born in Trinity Bay, Newfoundland to Capt. Patrick Joseph Fowlow Sr. and Mary Anne Connolly, the youngest of seven. His father was the captain of the ill-fated  SS Lion, who lost his life on January 6, 1882, before Robert was born. Robert, along with his brothers attended Saint Bonaventure's College in St. John's. He emigrated with his family to Boston, sailing from Port aux Basques in June 1901, and was living at 76 Berkshire Street, Cambridge, Massachusetts at the time of the 1904 Olympic games. Fowler is the first Newfoundland-born Olympic marathoner
 and, as he did not become a US citizen until September 16, 1907, is considered by some to be the first Newfoundland Olympian.

In 1941, Fowler was employed at the Boston Navy Yard. That same year he enlisted in the United States Military, at age 59.

Notes

See also
Ronald J. MacDonald

References

External links
Profile at www.sports-reference.com

1882 births
1957 deaths
Sportspeople from Newfoundland and Labrador
World record setters in athletics (track and field)
American male marathon runners
American male long-distance runners
Olympic track and field athletes of the United States
Athletes (track and field) at the 1904 Summer Olympics
Athletes (track and field) at the 1906 Intercalated Games
Emigrants from Newfoundland Colony to the United States